Don Domanski (April 29, 1950 – September 7, 2020) was a Canadian poet.

Biography
Domanski was born and raised in Sydney, Nova Scotia, and lived briefly in Toronto, Vancouver and Wolfville, before settling in Halifax, Nova Scotia, where he lived for most of his life. Author of nine collections of poetry, his work has been translated into Arabic, Chinese, Czech, French, Portuguese, and Spanish. In a review of Wolf-Ladder John Bradley described Domanski's poetry as "earthy and astral, dark and buoyant, a cross between Robert Bly, Ted Hughes, and the Brothers Grimm." 

In 1999 he received the Canadian Literary Award for Poetry from CBC (the Canadian Broadcasting Corporation). His 2007 collection All Our Wonder Unavenged was honoured with the Governor General's Award for Poetry, the Lieutenant Governor of Nova Scotia Masterworks Award, and the Atlantic Poetry Prize. In 2014 he won the J.M. Abraham Poetry Award for Bite Down Little Whisper. Domanski mentored other poets through the Banff Centre for the Arts Wired Writing Studio and the Writers' Federation of Nova Scotia Mentorship program.

Also a visual artist, he created art that appeared in galleries in Halifax and Seoul, South Korea, and on covers of his poetry collections. Domanski also collected fossils for over a decade, and subsequently turned his attention to meteorites and Stone Age tools. He found a neural arch of a 350-million-year-old (Lower Carboniferous) amphibian previously thought to have gone extinct in the Devonian period. He was given credit for the find in Amphibian Biology, Vol. 4,    Palaeontology, The Evolutionary History of Amphibians, ed. Harold Heatwole and Robert L. Carroll. His interest in religions inspired visits to churches and cathedrals in France, Ireland, England and Argentina, mosques in Istanbul, Rumi's tomb in Konya, and Buddhist temples and monasteries in China.

Bibliography

Poetry collections 
 1975: The Cape Breton Book of the Dead (House of Anansi Press)
 1978: Heaven (House of Anansi Press)
 1982: War in an Empty House (House of Anansi Press)
 1986: Hammerstroke (House of Anansi Press)
 1991: Wolf-Ladder (Coach House Press) (shortlisted for a Governor General's Award)
 1994: Stations of the Left Hand (Coach House Press) (shortlisted for a Governor General's Award)
 1998: Parish of the Physic Moon (McClelland & Stewart)
 2007: All Our Wonder Unavenged (Brick Books) (winner of the Governor General's Award, The Atlantic Poetry Prize and the Lieutenant Governor of Nova Scotia Masterworks Award)
 2013: Bite Down Little Whisper (Brick Books) (shortlisted for a Governor General's Award; winner of J. M. Abraham Poetry Prize)
 2021: Fetishes of the Floating World (Brick Books)

Pamphlets 

 2006: All Our Wonder Unavenged (Jack Pine Press)
 2006: Poetry and the Sacred (Ralph Gustafson Lecture, Institute for Coastal Research)
 2014: Field Notes (Corbel Stone Press)
 2015: Fetishes of the Floating World (espresso)

Anthologies 

 2007: Earthly Pages: The Poetry of Don Domanski (Wilfrid Laurier University Press)
2021: Selected Poems, 1975-2021 (Hardcover) (Corbel Stone Press)
2022: Selected Poems, 1975-2021 (Softcover) (Xylem Books)

Honours 

 1999 – Canadian Literary Award for Poetry (Canadian Broadcasting Corporation) 
 2007 – Governor General's Award for All Our Wonder Unavenged 
 2008 – The Atlantic Poetry Prize for All Our Wonder Unavenged 
 2008 – Lieutenant Governor of Nova Scotia Masterworks Award for All Our Wonder Unavenged 
 2014 – J.M. Abraham Poetry Award for Bite Down Little Whisper

Notes

Further reading
 Almon, Bert. "From Nova Scotia to the Cosmos." Review of Earthly Pages: The Poetry of Don Domanski. Canadian Literature 198 (Autumn 2008): 118–19. https://canlit.ca/article/from-nova-scotia-to-the-cosmos/
 Armstrong, Tammy. "Atlantic Canada's Poetic Menagerie: Animal Presence in the Poetry of John Thompson, Don Domanski, John Steffler and Harry Thurson." Abstract for PhD dissertation. 2014. https://unbscholar.lib.unb.ca/islandora/object/unbscholar%3A6230
 Bartlett, Brian. "Don Domanski." The Encyclopedia of Religion and Nature.  (2005).
 Bartlett, B. "The Trees Are Full of Rings." (Introduction to Earthly Pages: The Poetry of Don Domanski.)  (2007).
 Bartlett, B. "From The Basement of Fables: Don Domanski's Wolf-Ladder" All Manner of Tackle: Living with Poetry (2017): 179–94.
 Bondar, Alanna F. Review of All Our Wonder Unavenged. The Goose (on-line) 4.1 (Spring 2008). http://www.alecc.ca/uploads/goose/THE%20GOOSE%204%202008.pdf
 Colford, Ian. Review of Stations of the Left Hand. The Pottersfield Portfolio 16.2 (1996)80-82. http://www.iancolford.com/s/Stations_of_the_Left_Hand.pdf
 Cooley, Dennis. Review of Hammerstroke. Journal of Canadian Poetry  3 (1986).
 Downie, Glenn. "How Poems Work [Domanski's "Devildom"]." The Globe and Mail.  December 1, 2011. https://www.theglobeandmail.com/arts/how-poems-work/article22401676/
 Goldstein, David B. Review of Bite Down Little Whisper. The Malahat Review 186 (spring 2014): 87-91. http://malahatreview.ca/reviews/186reviews_goldstein.html
 Howell, Stevie. Review of Bite Down Little Whisper. Quill and Quire Dec. 2013. https://www.brickbooks.ca/reviews/bite-down-little-whisper-don-domanski-reviewed-by-stevie-howell/
 Johnson, S.D. "The Wisdom of Falling." Interview. Where the Words Come From: Canadian Poets in Conversation. Ed. Tim Bowling. Nightwood Editions, 2002, 244–55.
 Kenney, Patricia. "Rich Biodiversity in a Parallel Universe: Don Domanski's Bite Down Little Whisper." Arc July 17, 2014. https://arcpoetry.ca/2014/07/17/rich-biodiversity-in-a-parallel-universe-don-domanskis-bite-down-little-whisper/
 Knight, Erin. "Poets in Profile: Don Domanski." Interview. http://www.openbookontario.com/news/poets_profile_don_domanski/
 Leyton, Katherine. "Don Domanski." https://www.thecanadianencyclopedia.ca/en/article/don-domanski
 Lindsay, G. Review of Parish of the Physic Moon. Journal of Canadian Poetry  15 (1998).
 MacKendrick, Louis. Review of Stations of the Left Hand.  Journal of Canadian Poetry  11 (1996).
 Milton, Paul. "Wonder and the Sacred." Canadian Literature  198 (Autumn 2008): 123–24.
 Nason, Jim. "Don Domanski Presented by Jim Nason." Sept. 10, 2015. https://www.brickbooks.ca/week-37-don-domanski-presented-by-jim-nason/
 O'Meara, David. "Dangerous Words: Don Domanski and Metaphor." https://www.brickbooks.ca/reviews/dangerous-words-don-domanski-and-metaphor-reviewed-by-david-omeara/
 Oughton, John."Blank Paper and the Infinite: An Interview with Don Domanski." Poetry Canada Review 12.2 (1992).
 Pew, Jeff. "Don Domanski Presented by Jeff Pew." July 30, 2015. https://www.brickbooks.ca/don-domanski-presented-by-jeff-pew/
 Pirie, Pearl. "Don Domanski on Role of Poet as Scribe of Sacred Geometries." Pesbo (on-line). April 16, 2008. https://pearlformance.livejournal.com/98190.html
 Sowton, Ian. "Decision" Review of Hammerstroke. Canadian Literature 127 (Winter 1990): 159–60. https://canlit.ca/article/decisions/
 Stephenson, Liisa. "Signs and Wonders." Maple Tree Literary Supplement (Sept. 2011). https://www.mtls.ca/issue3/writings-review-stephenson.php 
 Strickland, Molly. "Progression Beyond Conscious Thought in 'Untitled with Invisible Ink.'" In Atlantic Canadian Poets' Archive. http://www.stu-acpa.com/don-domanski.html
 Sutherland, Fraser. "Domanski, Don Rusu." https://www.encyclopedia.com/arts/culture-magazines/domanski-don-rusu
 Szumigalski, Anne. Review of Parish of the Physic Moon. Quill and Quire 1996. https://quillandquire.com/review/parish-of-the-psychic-moon/
 Thran, Nick. "Thrash and Gasp." Review of All Our Wonder Unavenged. Books in Canada

External links 
 Don Domanski's official website: https://www.dondomanski.net
 An SMU Reading series event on March 4, 2021 - "Don Domanski: A Celebration": https://www.youtube.com/watch?v=mLWO5VD_fTg
 Don Domanski reading from All Our Wonder Unavenged at Killam Library, Dalhousie University, Halifax, March 13, 2008. https://vimeo.com/16276250
 Nick Thran reading of poems from All Our Wonder Unavenged. https://www.youtube.com/watch?v=Q54dVNSMywQ
 Nick Thran reading of poems from Bite Down Little Whisper. https://www.youtube.com/watch?v=6oW4M1yUfSU

1950 births
20th-century Canadian poets
20th-century Canadian male writers
21st-century Canadian poets
Canadian male poets
People from Sydney, Nova Scotia
Writers from Nova Scotia
21st-century Canadian male writers
2020 deaths